Olomouc Premyslid Castle is one of the most important castle complexes in the Czech Republic. It is located on Wenceslas hill in the historic city of Olomouc.

Originally there were two castles in Olomouc called "Old" and "new". The old one was located at the site of Villa Primavesi (street Alley).

Olomouc Castle is a National Cultural Monument of Czech Republic since 1962, along with other monuments on the territory of Czechoslovakia by the Government Resolution dated March 30, 1962, no. 251/62, and Regulation of the Government dated 16 August 1995, no. 262/1995.

References

Further reading 
DOHNAL, V. Nové poznatky o předgotickém opevnění olomouckého hradu. Opava : Slezské muzeum, 1988. 

Castles in the Czech Republic
Buildings and structures in Olomouc
National Cultural Monuments of the Czech Republic